Fear Factor Malaysia is a Malaysian adaptation of the American TV show Fear Factor. The original network to carry this format originally is NTV7 on 27 August 2005. The series was first launched as Fear Factor Malaysia on NTV7 in 2005. However, the channel discontinued the series after 7 years. The series was relaunched as Fear Factor Selebriti Malaysia on 29 December 2012.

Host
The first season of Fear Factor Malaysia was hosted by Shamser Sidhu in 2005. After it was relaunched in 2012, Fear Factor Celebrity Malaysia was hosted by actor Aaron Aziz.

Season 1
The first season was launched in 2005 featuring host Shamser Sidhu. The show was filmed in the capital city of Malaysia, Kuala Lumpur. Six contestants was chosen for the first season to compete for the prize of RM10,000.

Contestants
Six contestants were chosen. Note that the ages displayed were taken during the show's taping in 2005.

Elimination chart

Season 2 (Celebrity Edition)
The Fear Factor Malaysia is back for the second time after six years of disappearance. The Fear Factor Selebriti Malaysia was hosted by actor, Aaron Aziz. The Fear Factor Selebriti Malaysia was won by team Dazrin & Hairul.

Format
The name Fear Factor Malaysia was changed to Fear Factor Selebriti Malaysia which features 30 celebrities from different occupation and was later paired into a team of two which later make 15 teams.

Prize
The winner of Fear Factor Selebriti Malaysia will receive a cash prize of RM200,000. An additional RM10,000 will be given each week to the best overall performer of the week.

Location
The second season was filmed in Cape Town, South Africa.

Challenge
The 15 teams will be facing 25 challenges during the whole season. The weakest team will be sent home.

Contestants
The contestants consisted of celebrities. Note that the ages displayed were taken during the show's taping in 2012.

Partners
The contestants were later paired up with their chosen partners.

Elimination Chart

 Gold background and WINNER means the partners won Fear Factor Selebriti Malaysia.
 Silver background and RUNNER-UP means the partners was the runner-up on Fear Factor Selebriti Malaysia.
 Green background and WIN means the partners was the best overall performance and won RM10,000 for that week.
 Purple background and WIN means the partners was the winner in the Fear Factor challenge.
 Blue background and HIGH means the partners was on the top chart in that week.
 Orange background and LOW mean the partners worst challenge but safe.
 Dark Yellow background and WDR mean partners withdrew due to injuries.
 Pink background and SAFE mean the partners were originally eliminated but was saved.
 Red background and ELIM means the partners lost and was eliminated of the competition.

Season 3 (Celebrity Edition S2)
The second season of Fear Factor Selebriti Malaysia is back in 2014. The show was once again hosted by fellow actor, Aaron Aziz.

Format
This season features 32 contestants with 16 celebrities and 16 fans from around Malaysia. They were then paired a team of two with one celebrity and one fan.

Prize
The winner of Fear Factor Selebriti Malaysia will receive a cash prize of RM200,000.

Location
The third season was filmed once again in Cape Town, South Africa.

Challenge
The 16 teams will be facing 28 challenges during the whole season. The weakest team will be sent home.

Contestants
The contestants consisted of celebrities and fans. Note that the ages displayed were taken during the show's taping in 2014.

Elimination chart

See also
 Fear Factor

References

External links
 

Fear Factor
Malaysian reality television series
Non-American television series based on American television series
2005 Malaysian television series debuts
2014 Malaysian television series endings
2000s Malaysian television series
2010s Malaysian television series
Astro Ria original programming
NTV7 original programming
Television shows filmed in Malaysia
Television shows filmed in South Africa